Wallerawang is a small township in the Central Tablelands of New South Wales, Australia. It is also located on the Main Western railway line at the junction of the Gwabegar line.

History
The original inhabitants of the area west of the Blue Mountains were the Wiradjuri Aboriginal Australians. It is believed they knew the area as Waller-owang. It is understood to mean place near wood and water, or plenty of water.

James Blackman was probably the first European to visit the area when he marked out the route of the new road from Bathurst to the area now known as Wallerawang.

In 1824, 11 years after the first exploration led by Blaxland over the Blue Mountains, a James Walker was granted a large portion of land in the area now known as Wallerawang. In 1836 the property was to become known as Barton Park.

Two of Walker's convict servants took up land leases in the area in the 1850s, one of them was Maddox who named his lease Lidsdale.

Charles Darwin, the English naturalist, stayed at "Wallerowang House" (later to become Barton Park) in 1836. Darwin describes the countryside around the Wallerawang area and the wildlife including Platypus in his book "The Voyage of the Beagle".

The local school has operated at three sites, in 1860 the first small stone school opened near the present power station, in 1882 the school relocated nearer the township and finally to its present location near Lake Wallace in 1995. The 1860 school, which is still standing, was opened by James Walker's widow.

The Church of St John the Evangelist, built in 1881, was financed by private funding. It was designed by architect Edmund Blacket, and is listed on the New South Wales State Heritage Register.

In the 1890s, the nearby Pipers Flat railway station was the proposed site for a large iron and steel works proposed by free-trade politician and businessman, Joseph Mitchell. It would have made use of local deposits of coal, limestone and iron ore. Although Mitchell won a government contract to supply iron and steel, he died before he could bring his plans to fruition.

In 1950-1951, extensive plans were made by the Joint Coal Board for a modern planned township at Wallerawang, which would have been the terminus of electrification of the railway from Sydney, location of a new railway workshop and power station, and the transport hub for a major expansion of coal mining in the area. The Church of St John the Evangelist was to be relocated to a new location to make way for the new development. Apart from the Wallerawang Power Station and its associated mines, little came of these plans due to sustained opposition from political interests associated with nearby Lithgow.

Heritage listings 
Wallerawang has a number of heritage-listed sites, including:
 Main Street: St John the Evangelist Church, Wallerawang
 Main Western railway: Coxs River railway bridges, Wallerawang
 Main Western railway: Wallerawang railway station

Railway
The Main Western railway line passes through the town of Wallerawang. In 1870 the track was opened to Wallerawang on its way to the next temporary terminus at  later in 1870 and then  in 1872. The railway station closed during the early 1990s.

Wallerawang Power Station

A proposal for a new power station specifically designed to use the lower grade coal of the area was approved in 1950. Built beside the Coxs River, the site was determined in April 1950 with construction commencing properly in November 1951. It was declared open in 1957.

 The Wallerawang Power Station was a coal fired station located on the eastern side of the township.  
 In 1951 the Electricity Commission of New South Wales commenced construction of the power station, power being generated in 1957.
 In 1978 Lake Wallace was constructed to provide additional water cooling capacity for the power station. 
 With various upgrades the station generated power for the Australian national power grid.
 It was placed out of service in 2014 and is marked for demolition.

Military history

During World War II, Wallerawang was the location of RAAF No.4 Inland Aircraft Fuel Depot (IAFD), completed in 1942 and closed in 1944. Usually consisting of 4 tanks, 31 fuel depots were built across Australia for the storage and supply of aircraft fuel for the RAAF and the US Army Air Forces at a total cost of £900,000 ($1,800,000).

References

External links

 
Towns in New South Wales
Central Tablelands